Lake Cochapampa (possibly from Quechua qucha lake, pampa a large plain) is a lake in Peru located in the Laraos District, Yauyos Province of Lima Region. It is situated at a height of about  near Laraos within the Nor Yauyos-Cochas Landscape Reserve.

See also
 List of lakes in Peru
Lake Pumacocha (Lima)

References

Lakes of Peru
Lakes of Lima Region